Mihael Oswald (born 1892, date of death unknown) was a Yugoslav gymnast. He competed in nine events at the 1924 Summer Olympics.

References

External links
 

1892 births
Year of death missing
Yugoslav male artistic gymnasts
Olympic gymnasts of Yugoslavia
Gymnasts at the 1924 Summer Olympics
Sportspeople from Ljubljana